Torpovka is a rural locality (a khutor) in Michurinskoye Rural Settlement, Kamyshinsky District, Volgograd Oblast, Russia. The population was 441 as of 2010. There are 31 streets.

Geography 
Torpovka is located on the Volga Upland, on the right bank of the Yelshanka River, 9 km north of Kamyshin (the district's administrative centre) by road. Michurinsky is the nearest rural locality.

References 

Rural localities in Kamyshinsky District